Keum Nana (금나나, born 19 August 1983) is the winner of Miss Korea 2002. She participated in the Miss Universe pageant in 2003.  She attended but dropped out of Kyungpook National University School of Medicine in pursuit of undergraduate studies at Harvard University. She graduated from Harvard University in 2008, where she majored in Biochemistry. She then earned her master's degree in nutritional science at Columbia University while preparing her U.S. medical school applications. Nana Keum graduated from Harvard's TH Chan School of Public Health with a dual-doctorate in nutrition and epidemiology in 2015. She is currently a postdoctoral fellow at the TH Chan School of Public Health under the mentorship of Edward Giovannucci. She has published numerous peer-reviewed research papers and specializes in meta-analyses.

She is the author of "Everyone Can Do It" and "Study Diary of Nana" (both in Korean).

External links
 Official website

1983 births
Columbia University alumni
Harvard School of Public Health alumni
Kyungpook National University alumni
Living people
Miss Korea winners
Miss Universe 2003 contestants
Geum clan of Bonghwa
South Korean Buddhists